Zakir Safiullin (born 11 November 1986) is a Kazakhstani boxer. He competed in the men's lightweight event at the 2020 Summer Olympics. Safiullin is from Tatar descent.

References

External links
 

1986 births
Living people
Kazakhstani male boxers
Olympic boxers of Kazakhstan
Boxers at the 2020 Summer Olympics
Place of birth missing (living people)
Tatar sportspeople
Kazakhstani people of Tatar descent